Michelle Clark-Heard (born July 27, 1968) is a former head coach for the Cincinnati Bearcats women's basketball team.

Career
In her first year at Western Kentucky University her team posted a 22–11 record, after going 9–21 the season prior to her arrival.

In 2018 the University of Cincinnati hired her as the head coach for the Cincinnati women's basketball team. In her first season, she led the team to more than 20 wins for the first time since 2003 and at least 12 conference wins for the first time since 1999.

On March 7, 2023 she was fired as the head coach of the Cincinnati women's basketball team. She finishes with an overall record of 74–74 and a conference record of 35–46.

Head coaching record

References

Living people
1968 births
American women's basketball coaches
American women's basketball players
Atherton High School alumni
Basketball coaches from Kentucky
Basketball players from Louisville, Kentucky
Cincinnati Bearcats women's basketball coaches
Kentucky State Thorobrettes basketball coaches
Louisville Cardinals women's basketball coaches
Nebraska Cornhuskers women's basketball coaches
Sportspeople from Louisville, Kentucky
Western Kentucky Lady Toppers basketball coaches
Western Kentucky Lady Toppers basketball players